Technical Gymnasium Christiansbjerg (TGC) is a three-year technical exam program (HTX) in Aarhus, Denmark. The school was founded as Technical Gymnasium Risskov in the Aarhus suburb of Risskov, but was moved to Christiansbjerg in 2002. It is a part of Aarhus tech.

Notable students
 Anders Eggert

Secondary education in Denmark